Łukasz Gajda (born 19 March 2003) is a Polish professional footballer who plays as a midfielder for Odra Wodzisław Śląski, on loan from Bruk-Bet Termalica Nieciecza.

Career statistics

Club

Notes

References 

2003 births
Living people
Polish footballers
Association football midfielders
GKS Jastrzębie players
Bruk-Bet Termalica Nieciecza players
Odra Wodzisław Śląski players
I liga players
III liga players